National Bingo Night may refer to:

 National Bingo Night (American game show), the original version of the television game show
 National Bingo Night (Australian game show),  the Australian version of television the game show
 National Bingo Night (Indian game show),  the version of the television game show seen in India
 Pinoy Bingo Night, the version of the television show aired in the Philippines